Nareg Guregian (born January 20, 1989) is an American rower. He competed in the men's coxless pair event at the 2016 Summer Olympics.

References

External links
 

1989 births
Living people
American male rowers
Olympic rowers of the United States
Rowers at the 2016 Summer Olympics
Place of birth missing (living people)
Pan American Games medalists in rowing
Pan American Games bronze medalists for the United States
Rowers at the 2015 Pan American Games
World Rowing Championships medalists for the United States
Medalists at the 2015 Pan American Games